The 2019–20 Cercle Brugge K.S.V. season was the club's 121st season in existence and the 25th consecutive season in the top flight of Belgian football. In addition to the domestic league, Cercle Brugge participated in this season's edition of the Belgian Cup.

Players

On loan

Pre-season and friendlies

Competitions

Overall record

First Division A

League table

Results by round

Matches
On 2 April 2020, the Jupiler Pro League's board of directors proposed to cancel the season due to the COVID-19 pandemic. The General Assembly accepted the proposal on 15 May, and officially ended the 2019–20 season.

Belgian Cup

References 

Cercle Brugge K.S.V. seasons
Cercle Brugge